Lucifer on the Moon is a dub remix album of songs from Lucifer on the Sofa, the tenth studio album by American indie rock band Spoon. It is a track-by-track reworking, with all remixes by British dub producer Adrian Sherwood. It was announced on September 21, 2022, and released by Matador Records on November 4, 2022. Sherwood was given access to the entire album's original multi-tracks tapes. Sherwood and his On-U Sound colleagues provided additional instrumentation. Contributors include bassist Doug Wimbish and drummer Keith LeBlanc. It is Spoon's first remix album. They previously released a remix EP for the song "Wild" in May 2022, featuring contributions from Jack Antonoff and Dennis Bovell.

Critical reception

Heather Phares of AllMusic wrote, "More than anything, Lucifer on the Moon emphasizes just how much mileage is in Lucifer on the Sofas songs. The albums are brothers, but not twins; where Sofa found Spoon embracing the rock traditions underlying their music, Moon celebrates their adventurous spirit. Like many experiments, it's a little uneven, but its risks pay off more often than not." John Bungey Mojo felt Sherwood's remixes of "On the Radio" and "Astral Jacket" were his best. Tal Rosenberg of Pitchfork wrote, "Moon also showcases an unlikely collaboration that pushes both sides in new directions. But in trying to break new creative ground, these inventive musicians end up sounding stuck somewhere in the middle."

Track listing
All tracks are billed as an "Adrian Sherwood Reconstruction".

Personnel

Moon musicians
 Paul Booth – saxophone
 Alan Glenn – mouth organ
 Ivan 'Celloman' Hussey – cello, keys
 Keith LeBlanc – drums
 Pete Lockett – percussion
 Prisoner – drums
 Doug Wimbish – bass guitar

Sofa musicians
 Britt Daniel
 Jim Eno
 Alex Fischel
 Gerardo Larios
 Benny Trokan
 Steve Berlin
 Jennifer Marigliano
 Caroline Rose
 Ted Tafaro

Technical personnel
 Matthew Smyth – engineering, programming
 Chris Longwood – mastering

Other personnel
 Edel Rodriguez – illustrations
 Matt de Jong – design
 Jamie-James Medina – design

See also
 Echo Dek
 Have Fun with God

References

2022 remix albums
Dub albums
Spoon (band) albums
Matador Records remix albums
Remix albums by American artists
Albums produced by Adrian Sherwood